Socialist Janata (Democratic) Party broke away from Janata Dal (Secular). It merged with Janata Dal (United) on 29 December 2014.

History
The Kerala unit of the Janata Dal (Secular) is a part of the CPI (M)-led Left Democratic Front. The CPI(M)-JD(S) ties came under strain around 2008. Things worsened when the CPI(M) hesitated to give the JD(S) seat of the Kozhikode parliamentary constituency, in the 2009 Lok Sabha election, and the leading newspaper Mathrubhumi published lavalin issues, which is against Pinarayi vijayan. He got angry with the managing director of Mathrubhumi and the chief of SJ(D) MP Virendra Kumar. A major portion of the JD(S) led by M.P. Veerendra Kumar aligned with the United Democratic Front and launched the Socialist Janata (Democratic) Party on 7 August 2010. It merged with Janata Dal (United) on 29 December 2014.

In 2018, the Veerendra Kumar fraction of the Janata Dal (United) unit of Kerala under the leadership of M. P. Veerendra Kumar merged with Loktantrik Janata Dal.

Leaders 
 M. P. Veerendrakumar
 K. P. Mohanan
 M. V. Shreyams Kumar
 V. Surendran Pillai
 Varghese George
 Sheikh. P. Harris
 Gregorious Sakaria
 Manayath Chandran
 Charupara Ravi
 K. Shankaran Master
 Augustin Kolenchery
 V Kunjali
 Koran Master
 A.V Ramachandran
 Saleem Madavoor
 Ugin Morely
 Sabah Pulpatta
 N.C Moyinkutty
 T.M Sivarajan

References

External links
http://timesofindia.indiatimes.com/topic/article/08wK3983Wx9vN?q=janata+party

Defunct political parties in Kerala
2010 establishments in Kerala
2014 disestablishments in India
Defunct socialist parties in India
Democratic socialist parties in Asia
Former member parties of the United Progressive Alliance
Janata Dal
Janata Parivar
Political parties disestablished in 2014
Political parties established in 2010
Political parties in Kerala
Secularism in India